Greatest Hits: Souvenir Edition is a greatest hits album by Puerto Rican singer-songwriter Ricky Martin. It was released exclusively in Australia, New Zealand and Taiwan on April 12, 2013. The album was issued as a CD/DVD combo and features all of Martin's biggest hits, including: "María", "The Cup of Life", "Livin' la Vida Loca", "She Bangs" and "Nobody Wants to Be Lonely". Martin promoted the album during his 2013 Australian Tour.

Track listing

Charts

Weekly charts

Year-end charts

Certifications

Release history

References

2013 greatest hits albums
Ricky Martin compilation albums